The dentatothalamic tract (or dentatorubrothalamic tract) is a tract which originates in the dentate nucleus and follows the ipsilateral superior cerebellar peduncle, decussating later on and reaching the contralateral red nucleus and the contralateral thalamus. 

The term "dentatorubrothalamocortical" is sometimes used to emphasize termination in the cerebral cortex.

Additional images

See also

 Cerebellothalamic tract
 Red nucleus

References

External links

 
 NIF Search - Dentatothalamic Tract via the Neuroscience Information Framework
 https://web.archive.org/web/20091021004541/http://isc.temple.edu/neuroanatomy/lab/atlas/papc/

Cerebellar connections
Thalamic connections